Altice Portugal (formerly known as Portugal Telecom or PT) is the largest telecommunications service provider in Portugal. Since June 2, 2015, the company has been a wholly owned subsidiary of Altice Europe, a multinational cable and telecommunications company with a presence in France, Israel, Belgium, Luxembourg, Portugal, French West Indies/Indian Ocean Area, the Dominican Republic, and Switzerland. The assets in Portugal were sold to Altice in 2015 per request of Oi SA to reduce debt. The African assets were mostly sold for the same reason. Portugal Telecom, SGPS SA was split in separate companies: PT Portugal (now Altice Portugal) and Pharol (formerly PT SGPS), which owns a 27,5% stake in Oi.

History 
The first telephone experiments in Portugal connected Carcavelos to the Central do Cabo in Lisbon, in 1877. In 1882, the Edison Gower-Bell Telephone Company was established in both Lisbon and Porto, to develop the respective telephone service concessions. In 1887, the concession was transferred to APT - The Anglo Portuguese Telephone Company, which lasted until 1968, when the Public Company "Telefones de Lisboa e Porto" (TLP) was created. The Post Office, Telegraphs and Telephones (CTT) operated the telephone service in the rest of the country. For the operation of radiotelegraphy and wireless telephone, a contract with the Marconi's Wireless Telegraphy Company concession was confirmed in 1922. In 1925, the "Companhia Portuguesa Rádio Marconi" (CPRM) was set up and took on all responsibilities of the previous concession.
 
In 1970, CTT became a Public Company and in 1989, the TLP was transformed into a Limited Company, and was controlled by the State.

In 1992, the Portuguese government and the Public Service Television Corporation RTP agreed to separate the transmitter network from the rest of the corporation, transferring it to a recently created state-owned company named "Teledifusão de Portugal" (TDP). The purpose of this was to create a nationwide TV broadcasting network available for any TV station in Portugal to request its services. At the time, RTP (a "native" client of TDP) was facing competition for the first time since its creation in the 1950s. SIC required the services of TDP, but TVI decided to create its own transmitter Network (RETI).

In 1992, CTT became a Limited Company with public capital and the Comunicações Nacionais, SPGS, SA (CN) was created, a state holding company responsible for the managing of all state participation within the sector, comprising CTT, TLP, CPRM and TDP. That year, the telecommunications operations of CTT were detached with the creation of Telecom Portugal, SA, allowing CTT to dedicate itself to postal services. With this, Portugal's telecommunications network was operated by three operators: TLP in the Lisbon and Porto areas, Telecom Portugal was responsible for the remaining national, European and Mediterranean communications; and Marconi took on international traffic. In 1994, a single national telecommunications operator was created with the combination of the companies within the CN State holding: Portugal Telecom, SA (PT) merged into one Telecom Portugal, TLP and TDP.

Portugal Telecom was the only telephone operator in Portugal, being a monopoly, until 1994, when the government gradually reduced its control over the corporation. In 2000, Portugal Telecom became a publicly owned company.

In early 2007, the Portuguese conglomerate, Sonae's takeover offer for Portugal Telecom failed. PT's board rejected an initial bid, worth EUR 11.1 bn, in February 2006. Sonae.com's takeover bid opposed Belmiro de Azevedo (founder and historical chairman of Sonae holding company) and his son Paulo Azevedo (then the head officer of Sonae.com telecommunications operator) to the investor José Berardo and PT's administrators Zeinal Bava and Henrique Granadeiro. In April 2007 the European Commission gave an ultimatum to the Portuguese government ordering it to give up on the 500 golden shares pack that it owned on the company and that enable special veto powers to the government on vital issues. This could give the government a decisive role in the bid by any company to buy Portugal Telecom. In November 2007, Portugal Telecom spun off its media assets (PT Multimédia), that included TV Cabo and Lusomundo Cinemas. In January 2008, the European Commission began legal proceedings against the Portuguese government over its 'golden share' in incumbent telecoms operator Portugal Telecom. The 500 golden shares with extended voting rights, allowing it to block potential takeover bids, were the reason for the commission's legal action. Similarly, in November 2005, the commission had forced the Spanish government to give up its golden share in the other telecommunications' major player in the Iberian Peninsula, the Spanish telecoms giant Telefónica.

In December 2009, Portugal Telecom purchased RETI.

On October 2, 2013, Portugal Telecom and Brazil's Oi said they would combine operations to form a new Brazil-based company with more than 100 million subscribers. The resulting company's provisional name is CorpCo.

Armando Almeida replaced Zeinal Bava at the helm of Portugal Telecom on August 18, 2014. Zeinal Bava skipped off to Oi in Brazil.

On June 2, 2015, Altice Group announced closing of Portugal Telecom acquisition. Paulo Manuel da Conceição Neves was appointed as CEO.

On November 21, 2017, Paulo Neves resigned as CEO and was replaced by Alexandre Filipe Fonseca.

Operations

Domestic

Altice owns MEO, the largest landline operator in Portugal. Its operating brands include MEO, a quadruple play service provider and SAPO, an ISP and producer of web content. Portugal Telecom also owns Altice Labs (formerly known as PT Inovação), an IT services and research and development company; PT Contact, focused in the business of managing contact centres.

International 

Brazil was Portugal Telecom's second-largest market. PT agreed to acquire 22.4% of Telemar Norte Leste (Oi), the country's largest telecommunications firm, in July 2010. Separately it also had 29% of UOL, a major Brazil-based ISP and online service provider; and was the sole owner of Dedic, a call centre operator. PT previously held 29.7% of Vivo, the country's largest mobile phone network, which it controlled jointly with Telefónica. It agreed however to sell its stake to Telefónica for €7.5 billion in July 2010.

Portugal Telecom's other main international assets were based in Africa and Asia, largely in Portuguese-speaking nations. Through a 75%-owned investment holding company Africatel, PT had an effective 18.75% of Angola's largest mobile operator Unitel; 30% of Cabo Verde Telecom (CVT) of Cape Verde; 38.25% of Companhia Santomense de Telecomunicações (CST) of São Tomé and Príncipe; and 25.5% of the Namibian mobile firm MTC. The firm sold a 32% shareholding in Méditel of Morocco in September 2009.

In Asia Portugal Telecom owned 41.1% of Timor Telecom of East Timor.

Ownership 
Altice Portugal is no longer a publicly traded company, since 100% of its capital is owned by Altice Group.

As of 15 November 2011 its major stockholders were Espírito Santo Financial Group (11.30%), RS Holding (10.05%), Capital Research and Management (9.97%), Oi;k (7.00%), Caixa Geral de Depósitos (6.23%), Brandes Investment Partners (5.24%) and Norges Bank (5.01%).

After privatization the Portuguese government owned 500 golden shares in PT, which carried special rights over the company's management decisions and blocked any one shareholder from holding more than 10% of voting rights within the company. The golden shares were the subject of a long running dispute between the government and the European Commission, which alleged that their existence was illegal under EU law. Portugal argued that the shares were in the public interest. A case brought before the European Court of Justice by the commission to force the government to cede its shares resulted in the announcement of their abolition in July 2011.

On 2 October 2013 it was reported that Portugal Telecom and Brazil's Oi are to Merge to create a Brazil-based company.

Since June 2, 2015, it is a wholly owned subsidiary of Altice Group, a multinational cable and telecommunications company with a presence in France, Israel, Belgium & Luxembourg, Portugal, French West Indies/Indian Ocean Area and Dominican Republic (“Overseas Territories”) and Switzerland.

Notes

External links 
 

 
Telecommunications companies of Portugal
Portuguese brands
Telecommunications companies established in 1994
Companies based in Lisbon
2015 mergers and acquisitions